Luna Vanzeir (born 7 January 2003) is a Belgian footballer who plays as a forward and midfielder for KRC Genk and the Belgium national team.

International career
Vanzeir made her debut for the Belgium national team on 12 June 2021, coming on as a substitute for Jassina Blom against Luxembourg.

References

2003 births
Living people
Women's association football midfielders
Women's association football forwards
Belgian women's footballers
Belgium women's international footballers
Oud-Heverlee Leuven (women) players
Super League Vrouwenvoetbal players